Sadun-e Yek (also Romanized as Sa‘dūn-e Yek) is a village in Bani Saleh Rural District, Neysan District, Hoveyzeh County, Khuzestan Province, Iran. At the 2006 census, its population was 153, in 25 families.

References 

Populated places in Hoveyzeh County